The National Assembly is the legislative branch of the government of Nicaragua founded in 1986 to replace the bicameral National Congress of Nicaragua, which consisted of two chambers.

Composition

The Nicaraguan legislature is a unicameral body.
It is made up of 92 deputies, 90 of whom are elected by popular vote on a proportional representation basis from party lists: 20 nationally, and 70 representing the country's departments and autonomous regions.
In addition, the President of the Republic who served the immediately previous presidential term is entitled to sit in the Assembly as a deputy, as is the runner-up in the most recent presidential election. The President and the National Assembly serve concurrent five-year terms.

To be eligible for election to the Assembly, candidates must be (Art. 134, Constitution):
Nicaraguan nationals. If they have held any other nationality, it must have been renounced at least four years prior to the election.
In full enjoyment of their political and civic rights.
At least 21 years old.
Residents of the country for at least four years prior to the election (exemptions are granted to members of the diplomatic corps and employees of international organisations, and to those recently returned from studying abroad).
Born in the department or autonomous region they hope to represent, or having resided there for at least two years prior to the election.

The following are disqualified from serving in the Assembly:
Ministers, vice-ministers, and other members of the cabinet, magistrates and judges, and mayors, unless they resign from those positions at least 12 months prior to the election.
Ministers of any church or religious organization, unless they have relinquished their ministry at least 12 months in advance of the election.

Four months before the Nicaraguan general election, 2016, the Nicaraguan Supreme Court removed PLI leader Eduardo Montealegre, decreeing that Pedro Reyes was the new leader of the PLI. After PLI and allied Sandinista Renovation Movement deputies objected, Nicaragua's Supreme Electoral Council ordered them removed from the National Assembly and empowered Reyes to select their replacements.

Election results

Deputies as of June 21, 2021:
Adilia del Pilar Salinas Otero
Alba Estela González Tórrez
Alejandro Mejía Ferreti
Alyeris Beldramina Arias Siezar
Angela Espinoza Tórrez
Antenor Enrique Urbina Leyva
Argentina del Socorro Parajón Alejos
Arling Patricia Alonso Gómez
Arturo José Valdéz Robleto
Benita del Carmen Arbizú Medina
Brooklyn Rivera Bryan
Byron Rodolfo Jeréz Solis
Camila del Socorro Mejía Rodríguez
Carlos Emilio López Hurtado
Carlos Wilfredo Navarro Moreira
Delia María Law Blanco
Digna Lidia Betanco Aguilar
Dora Elena Rojas
Doris Zulema García Canales
Douglas Alemán Benavides
Edwin Ramón Castro Rivera
Efren José González Briones
Enrique Aldana Burgos
Evelin Patricia Aburto Torres
Evile del Socorro Umaña Olivas
Felix Andrés Sandoval Jarquín
Filiberto Jacinto Rodríguez López
Florence Ivette Levy Wilson
Gladis de los Ángeles Báez
Gloria del Rosario Montenegro
Gloria María Maradiaga
Guillermo Eduardo Arce Castaño
Gustavo Eduardo Porras Cortés
Haydee Azucena Castillo Barquero
Heberto Octavio Ruíz Morales
Irís Marina Montenegro Blandón
Irma de Jesús Dávila Lazo
Jenny Azucena Martínez Gómez
Jimmy Harold Blandón Rubio
Johanna del Carmen Luna Lira
José Antonio Zepeda López
José Ramón Sarria Morales
José Santos Figueroa Aguilar
José Santos López Gómez
Josefina Roa Romero
Juan Ramón Jiménez
Juan Ramón Meza Romero
Juan Ramón Obregón Valdivia
Juana Isaura Chavarría Salgado
Justo Armando Peña Aviles
Laura Estela Bermúdez Robleto
Lester Adrián Villareal Pérez
Ligia María Arauz Pavón
Loria Raquel Dixon Brautigam
Lucina Leonor Paz Rodríguez
Luis Coronel Cuadra
Luis Manuel Velásquez Manzanares
María Agustina Montenegro López
María Auxiliadora Martínez Corrales
María Haydee Osuna Ruíz
María Jilma Rosales Espinoza
Mario José Asensio Florez
Mario Valle Dávila
Maritza del Socorro Espinales
Martha Rosa Navarrete Mendoza
Maryinis Ibet Vallejoz Chavarría
Mauricio Orué Vásquez
Maximino Rodríguez Martínez
Melba del Socorro Sánchez Suárez
Melvin Martín Agurcia Perrott
Miguel Anselmo Rosales Ortega
Milciades Adrian Martínez Rodríguez
Mirta Mercedes Carrión Cano
Nallirys Aragón Cantillano
Násser Sebastián Silwany Baéz
Osorno Cóleman Salomón
Patricia Mercedes Sánchez Urbina
Pedro Antonio Haslam Mendoza
Pedro Joaquín Treminio Mendoza
Perla Soledad Castillo Quintero
Reynaldo Altamirano Alaníz
Roberto José Lira Villalobos
Rosa Argentina Navarro Sánchez
Rosa Herminia Irías Figueroa
Rubén de Jesús Gómez Suárez
Ruth de Jesús Molina Flores
Ruth del Socorro Cerda Acosta
Santiago José Martínez Lacayo
Walmart Antonio Gutiérrez Mercado
Walter Eden Espinoza Fernández
Wendy María Guido

Parliamentary groups
The deputies are organized in Parliamentary Groups (bancadas). The current number of deputies of the parliamentary political parties is:

Sandinista National Liberation Front (FSLN): 71 deputies
Constitutionalist Liberal Party (PLC): 14 deputies
Independent Liberal Party (PLI): 2 deputies
Nicaraguan Liberal Alliance (ALN): 2 deputies
Conservative Party (PC): 1 deputy
Alliance for the Republic (APRE): 1 deputy
YATAMA: 1 deputy

See also
List of presidents of the National Assembly of Nicaragua
National Congress of Nicaragua - Former bicameral legislature until 1979
Politics of Nicaragua
List of legislatures by country
List of political parties in Nicaragua

Notes

References

External links
  

Politics of Nicaragua
Political organizations based in Nicaragua
Nicaragua
Government of Nicaragua
Nicaragua
1986 establishments in Nicaragua